National Constituent Assembly may refer to:

 Constituent assembly, a body of representatives assembled to draft or adopt a constitution

Specific assemblies
(alphabetical by country or state)

A – C
 1972 Bahraini Constituent Assembly election
 Constituent Assembly of Bangladesh (1971–1973)
 Bolivian Constituent Assembly (various, from 1825 to 1967)
 Bolivian Constituent Assembly of 2006–07
 Brazilian Constituent Assembly (1988)
 Cambodia Constituent Assembly (1993)
 Constituent Assembly of Colombia (1991)
 Constituent Assembly of Costa Rica (1949)

D – I
 Ecuadorian Constituent Assembly (2007–2008)
 National Assembly (Eritrea) (1997)
 1919 Estonian Constituent Assembly election
 National Constituent Assembly (France) (1789–1791)
 Constituent Assembly of Georgia (1919–1921)
 Constituent Assembly of India (1946–1950)
 Constituent Assembly of Italy (1946–1948)

J – P
 Constituent Assembly of Jammu and Kashmir (1951–1957)
 Constituent Assembly of Lithuania (1920–1922)
 Constituent Assembly of Luxembourg (1848)
 Constituent Assembly of Pakistan (1947)
 Constituent Assembly (Philippines), a provision of the 1987 Constitution
 National Constituent Assembly (Portugal) (1911)
 Constituent Assembly of Portugal (1975–1976)

R – Z
 Russian Constituent Assembly (1917–1918)
 Constituent Assembly of Tunisia (2011–2014)
 Ukrainian Constituent Assembly (1917–1918)
 1999 Constituent National Assembly, Venezuela
 2017 Constituent National Assembly, Venezuela